Teun Luijkx (born 1986) is a Dutch actor.

Luijkx grew up in Oerle, near Veldhoven. In high school, he showed interest in theater, so he ended up at the Theatre Foundation Plan in Eindhoven, a project where professional theater directors to amateurs have a chance to gain experience. After high school, he went in 2004 to Maastricht Theatre Academy, where he graduated in 2008.

After a small role in the television series Battlestar Galactica in 2008 and a supporting role in the series S1NGLE, he was cast as one of the main characters in A'dam - EVA, a collaboration between the VARA, the NTR and VPRO. In May 2011, he played with Toneelgroep Maastricht together with Reinier Demeijer. This critically acclaimed musical theater production will end August 2011 in reprise during the Cultura Nova festival in Heerlen.

In 2013, his starred in the film &ME.

Filmography

External links 
 

1986 births
Living people
21st-century Dutch male actors
People from Veldhoven
Dutch male television actors
Dutch male film actors